Giorgi Margvelani (born 24 April 1994) is a professional rugby union player from Georgia. His position is Prop and he currently plays for Agen in the Top 14.

References 

1994 births
Living people
Rugby union players from Georgia (country)
SU Agen Lot-et-Garonne players
Rugby union props
Rugby union players from Tbilisi